Snakes on a Train is a 2006 direct-to-video action thriller horror film released by The Asylum as a mockbuster on August 15, 2006. Aspects of the film are inspired by the film Snakes on a Plane, which was scheduled for theatrical release three days later on August 18, 2006.

Plot
Although taking the same basic idea from Snakes on a Plane (many deadly snakes loose on a claustrophobic, high-speed means of transport), the background story of how the snakes end up on the train differs.

In the film, a woman has been put under a Mayan curse which causes snake eggs to hatch inside her belly and eat their way out. In order to recover the "lost pieces" of herself (the snakes), she must travel to Los Angeles where a powerful Mayan shaman can lift the curse. She takes the snakes along with her in small jars. While on the train, bandits attack her, allowing the snakes to escape, endangering the other passengers.

Eventually, and inexplicably, she herself transforms into a gigantic snake and swallows the moving train whole.

Six passengers manage to escape unharmed, and one of them performs a magic ritual which causes her to vanish. However, one girl is shown to have been unknowingly bitten, suggesting that the curse will remain.

Cast
 Alby Castro as Brujo
 Julia Ruiz as Alma
 Giovanni Bejarano as Miguel
 Amelia Jackson Gray as Crystal
 Shannon Gayle as Summer
 Lola Forsberg as Lani
 Carolyn Meyer as Klara
 Isaac Wade as Martin
 Madeleine Falk as Nancy
 Derek Osedach as Mitch
 Stephen A.F. Day as Conductor
 Al Galvex as Julio
 Jay Costelo as Juan 
 Jason S. Gray as Chico
 Sean Durrie as Dickie
 Nick Slatkin as Raz

Production
According to co-producer David Rimawi, The Asylum initially had no intention of making the film, but they proceeded when an earlier film project fell through. While looking for international distributors at Cannes, a group of Japanese investors saw the film's poster and asked if there really was a giant snake eating a train (which was originally not part of the film). In response, Rimawi had his crew in Los Angeles add the aforementioned scene to the film to make the Japanese audiences happy.

Reception
The film has received mostly negative reviews. When reviewed by Variety magazine, it was described "neither undiscriminating action fans nor connoisseurs of high camp will find much bite in this latest direct-to-video product from The Asylum."  Scott Foy, reviewing the film for Dread Central, asked "how the hell do you produce a rip-off this dispirited?"

See also
List of killer snake films

References

External links
Official site

2006 independent films
2006 films
2006 action thriller films
2006 direct-to-video films
2006 horror films
American action thriller films
American action horror films
American horror thriller films
The Asylum films
Mockbuster films
Films about snakes
American natural horror films
Films set on trains
Films directed by Peter Mervis
2000s English-language films
2000s American films
Films with screenplays by Eric Forsberg